Oriane Ondono (born 14 April 1996) is a French handball player who plays for Neptunes de Nantes and the French national team.

References

External links

1996 births
Living people
French female handball players
Black French sportspeople
People from Alfortville
Sportspeople from Val-de-Marne